, also known as , is the founder of the Kujō family (at the encouragement of Minamoto no Yoritomo), although some sources cite Fujiwara no Morosuke (908-960) as its founder.

Kanezane organised the compilation of the Kitano Tenjin Engi, the history of the Kitano Shrine. 

In April 1186 he became regent  and in 1189 was appointed Chief Minister.

A descendant of Fujiwara no Michinaga's line, he was the son of Fujiwara no Tadamichi, and his brother, Jien was the author of the historical work Gukanshō.  

In 1202 he ordained as a Buddhist monk and took on the Dharma name Enshō (円証).

Family
 Father: Fujiwara no Tadamichi
 Mother: Kaga no Tsubone
 Wives and children:
 Wife: Fujiwara no Tomoko, Fujiwara no Sueyuki‘s daughter
 Kujō Yoshimichi (1167-1188)
 Kujō Yoshitsune
 Ryoku
 Empress Dowager Gishūmon-in Fujiwara no Takako (1173-1239) married Emperor Go-Toba
 Wife: Fujiwara no Akisuke’s daughter
 Ryoan (1179-1220)
 Kujō Yoshihira (1184-1240)
 Ryokai (1185-1243)
 Wife: Hachijoin-no-tsubone
 Kujō Yoshisuke (1185-1218)
Unknown
 Ryokai
 Ryoji
 Daughter married Shinran

References

 
 Japanese Wikipedia

1149 births
1207 deaths
Fujiwara clan
Kujō family
People of Heian-period Japan
People of Kamakura-period Japan
Kamakura period Buddhist clergy
12th-century Japanese calligraphers
Japanese diarists